Anne Marie Bobby (born December 12, 1967, in Paterson, New Jersey) is an American actress, voice artist, playwright and author, best known for her role as Lori Winston, the heroine in Clive Barker's Nightbreed and Brigid Tenenbaum in the BioShock series. She was praised by The Washington Post for her portrayal of Tallasse in What the Deaf Man Heard (1997). The Los Angeles Times called Bobby's Tallasse "a sensitive, insightful portrayal."

Bobby also played a police officer in Cop Rock and in 2016, the New York Times compared her performance in, "Why Can't a Man Be More Like a Woman?" to a Broadway performance. In another musical, Groundhog, Bobby was praised for her duets and solos.

She attended NYU, where she studied Anthropology and Classics.

Selected film, television and other credits

References

External links

 

Living people
1967 births
American television actresses
American film actresses
American video game actresses
20th-century American actresses
21st-century American actresses
Actresses from New Jersey
Writers from Paterson, New Jersey
New York University alumni
Actors from Paterson, New Jersey